Judith Levy may refer to:

Judith Levy (1706-1803), English philanthropist and socialite
Judith Anne Levy (born 1934), Australian politician
Judith Ellen Levy (born 1958), American judge